Aldo Italo Olcese Vassallo (born 23 October 1974 in Lima) is a retired Peruvian footballer who last played as an attacking midfielder for Deportivo Municipal.

Club career
Olcese made his debut in the Torneo Descentralizado with America de Cochahuayco in the 1993 season.

International career
Olcese was called up by manager Paulo Autuori for his debut with the senior Peru national team on 23 February 2003. With the score already 3–1, Aldo entered the game in the 59th minute for Fernando del Solar  to help his team win the friendly match 5–1 over Haiti. In one of his next games he played the whole second half in Peru's 3-0 win over Chile on 2 April 2003.

References

1974 births
Living people
Footballers from Lima
Peruvian footballers
Peru international footballers
Sporting Cristal footballers
Juan Aurich footballers
Alianza Atlético footballers
K.A.A. Gent players
S.C. Eendracht Aalst players
Club Alianza Lima footballers
Changsha Ginde players
Cienciano footballers
Total Chalaco footballers
Ayacucho FC footballers
Unión Comercio footballers
Deportivo Municipal footballers
Peruvian Primera División players
Peruvian expatriate footballers
Association football midfielders
Expatriate footballers in Belgium
Expatriate footballers in China
Peruvian expatriate sportspeople in China
Belgian Pro League players
Chinese Super League players